Bogați is a commune in Argeș County, Muntenia, Romania. It is composed of eight villages: Bârloi, Bogați, Bujoi, Chițești, Dumbrava, Glâmbocel, Glâmbocelu and Suseni.

References

Communes in Argeș County
Localities in Muntenia